3-Methyl-19-methyleneandrosta-3,5-dien-17β-ol is a synthetic, steroidal estrogen and a selective agonist of the ERβ. It was discovered serendipitously and was the lead compound among a series of androsta-3,5-dienes as ERβ ligands. The EC50 of the compound for the ERβ was found to be 69 nM and its intrinsic activity was 92% (relative to that of estradiol). As such, it is a potent ERβ agonist with high affinity and selectivity.

References

Secondary alcohols
Androstanes
Selective ERβ agonists
Synthetic estrogens